Umar Defeats a Dragon is a page from a Mughal Illuminated manuscript illustrating an episode from the Hamzanama.  The page size is 55 x 70 cm. It is in the collection of the Museum of Applied Arts, Vienna, Vienna.

The manuscript is credited to Daswanth.  The illuminated manuscript shows Umar fighting a dragon from the Hamzanama manuscript, from the Mughal dynasty.

References

External links
Akbar, Mogulreich, Großmogul Österreichisches Museum für angewandte Kunst / Gegenwartskunst

Islamic illuminated manuscripts
Mughal art
Indian manuscripts